Bita Ghezelayagh (born 1966) is an Italian-born artist who lives and works in Tehran and London. Best known for her sculptural, felting work.

Biography 
She was born in Florence and was brought up in Tehran. Ghezelayagh studied architecture at the École nationale supérieure d'architecture de Paris-La Villette.

In 1994, she went to Tehran to work on a building restoration project for the Association of Iranian Calligraphers. She was also art director for three Iranian films.

In 2003, she began studying the traditional craft of felt-making. She had her first solo exhibition in Tehran five years later. This was followed by other solo exhibitions, including a touring exhibition in the United Kingdom. Ghezelayagh has participated in group shows at the Sharjah Art Museum the Victoria and Albert Museum the Casa Árabe in Madrid, the Iris & B. Gerald Cantor Center for Visual Arts and the San Antonio Museum of Art.

Her work is included in the collections of the British Museum in London, the Farjam Foundation in Dubai and the Devi Art Foundation in New Delhi.

In 2011, she was included on the short list for the Jameel Prize for contemporary art.

She is married to journalist Christopher de Bellaigue.

References

External links 
 

1966 births
Living people
20th-century women textile artists
20th-century textile artists
21st-century women textile artists
21st-century textile artists
20th-century Iranian women artists
21st-century Iranian women artists
Iranian women sculptors
Iranian contemporary artists
Iranian sculptors
Iranian textile artists